Sir Colin Richard Budd,  (born 31 August 1945) is a British civil servant and diplomat. He served as Chef de Cabinet to the Vice President of the European Commission from 1993 to 1996; as Deputy Secretary of the Cabinet Office, Head of the Overseas and Defence Secretariat, and Chair of the Joint Intelligence Committee from 1996 to 1997; and as the United Kingdom's Ambassador to the Netherlands from 2001 to 2005.

References

1945 births
Living people
Members of HM Diplomatic Service
Civil servants in the Foreign Office
Civil servants in the Cabinet Office
Ambassadors of the United Kingdom to the Netherlands
Knights Commander of the Order of St Michael and St George
European civil servants
Place of birth missing (living people)
British officials of the European Union